The Chenankavu temple (ശ്രീ ചേനാങ്കാവ് ഭഗവതി ക്ഷേത്രം) is a famous Bhagavathi temple in Kerala, located in Korom village, Payyanur, in north Kerala. This temple is renowned for its two annual festivals, Vishu Maholsavam and Saptaham Vayana, both held concurrently in the first half of April each year.

Navaratri aghosham is held every year. "Valiya guruthi" is the important vazhipadu of Chenankavu Temple.

See also
 Temples of Kerala

External links
Official website

Bhagavathi temples in Kerala
Hindu temples in Kannur district